Rafael dos Santos de Oliveira (born 30 June 1987), commonly known as Rafinha, is a Brazilian footballer who plays as a striker.

Rafinha scored in the final as Ulsan Hyundai defeated Al-Ahli of Saudi Arabia to win the 2012 AFC Champions League. He subsequently represented Ulsan Hyundai in the 2012 FIFA Club World Cup, playing in both matches and earning recognition in FIFA's official technical report.

Club statistics

Honours
Ulsan Hyundai
 AFC Champions League (1): 2012

References

Externaler links 

1987 births
Living people
Brazilian footballers
Brazilian expatriate footballers
Expatriate footballers in Japan
Brazilian expatriate sportspeople in Japan
Expatriate footballers in South Korea
Brazilian expatriate sportspeople in South Korea
Nacional Atlético Clube (SP) players
Votoraty Futebol Clube players
J1 League players
J2 League players
K League 1 players
Avispa Fukuoka players
Thespakusatsu Gunma players
Gamba Osaka players
Yokohama F. Marinos players
Ulsan Hyundai FC players
People from Osasco
Association football forwards
Footballers from São Paulo (state)